William Albert Chaney (December 23, 1922 – March 13, 2013) was an American historian of Anglo-Saxon England. Chaney spent his career at Lawrence University, where he taught from 1952 until his death; he held the George McKendree Steele endowed chair in history from 1962 until his official retirement in 1999, and was chair of the history department from 1968 to 1971. Chaney's studies focused on the conversion from paganism to Christianity and sacral kingship. His work culminated in his 1970 book, The Cult of Kingship in Anglo-Saxon England: The Transition from Paganism to Christianity.

Chaney was born in California and, at age 16, graduated from high school as valedictorian of his class. He completed both his Bachelor of Arts and Ph.D. at the University of California, Berkeley. Chaney was awarded two fellowships from Berkeley, and made a fellow of the Harvard Society of Fellows. The awards allowed him to spend time at Harvard and Princeton, and in Europe—the start to what would become 49 trips to the continent over the course of his career. As a 29 year old in 1952, Chaney both received his doctorate and began teaching at Lawrence. He said later that "I thought I would stay two or three years to see what a liberal arts college was like", but then "fell in love with the place", and never left.

Chaney was a popular presence on campus; he was Lawrence's second-longest-serving professor. A "Chaney course" was considered a rite of passage for many students, and, by the time of his retirement, 80% of all living alumni had passed through the college during his tenure. For more than four decades, Chaney hosted a "salon" three or four days a week at his apartment whereby students would gather for conversation and classical music. He was known as an engaging speaker, and conducted scores of lectures at Lawrence and in the broader community.

Early life and education 
William Albert Chaney, who went by "Bill," was born in Lodi, California, on December 23, 1922. His mother, Esther Bowen Chaney, was from Ashland, Nebraska, and his father, Horace P. Chaney, from Monrovia, California. An older brother, Robert H. Chaney, was born in 1919. Their father died in 1925, when William Chaney was two years old, and his brother six. The brothers descended from what one colleague described as "southerners who had consistently backed the wrong horse in the great conflicts of American history"; during one conversation, when William Chaney asked his grandmother which president she was speaking of, she replied "Bill, you surely know that I'm talking about Jefferson Davis. He's the only president we've ever had."

Chaney later claimed that his interest in the Middle Ages started early in life, and that he was reading Walter Scott when his peers were reading children's books. He graduated as valedictorian of his class at Lodi Union High School in 1939, aged 16. After matriculating at the College of the Pacific he transferred to the University of California, Berkeley. He was admitted into the honor society Phi Beta Kappa as a senior, and completed his Bachelor of Arts in 1943, majoring in medieval history. Chaney then began working on his master's degree there while working as a teacher's assistant, and in 1944 was granted a fellowship in the history department.

In 1947, while working on his Ph.D. at Berkeley, Cheney was awarded the Sigmund Martin Heller traveling fellowship by the university, to spend a year working towards his degree at Harvard and Princeton Universities. His mother traveled with Chaney to Cambridge, where she spent the year. In 1949, Chaney, having returned to live in Berkeley again, was made a fellow of the Harvard Society of Fellows. He was recommended for the fellowship by Maurice Bowra, whom Chaney had met while traveling Europe on a Berkeley fellowship. The distinction came with three years of room and board, along with traveling expenses and $1,500 annually. In September, Chaney left for Harvard, where he stayed at Dunster House. He completed his Ph.D. at Berkeley in 1952, under Ernst Kantorowicz's advisement, with the thesis "Anglo-Saxon Kings and Kingship as Exponents of Ecclesiastical Thought".

Career 

In 1952, Chaney was appointed to a post at Lawrence University (then Lawrence College) in Appleton, Wisconsin. He started in the fall term, with his mother again coming along and living with him, and soon began greeting new students in turn. In 1954, Chaney started teaching the course "a history of western civilization," and organized a four-day medieval festival at the college, which included two lectures by him. Starting in 1956, Chaney became the college's representative for the Woodrow Wilson National Fellowship Foundation, which sought to recruit promising college graduates for academic careers. He also became the representative of the Rhodes Scholarship program at Lawrence. Chaney was promoted to associate professor in June 1958, and spent that summer as a visiting professor at Michigan State University. During a leave of absence from 1959 to 1960, Chaney spent 15 months in Europe—mostly at Oxford, with further time spent consulting manuscripts at Cambridge, the British Museum, and church and library archives throughout Britain, Heidelberg, Vienna, Spain, and Greece. Chaney was named the George McKendree Steele endowed chair in history in 1962, and made a full professor in May 1966. He took another sabbatical leave of absence from 1966 to 1967, with a grant from the American Council of Learned Societies, to work at Oxford; much of his time was spent at the Bodleian Library, where he conducted research in support of a forthcoming book, provisionally entitled "Medieval Kingship". From 1968 to 1971 Chaney was the chair of the history department, then from 1971 to 1972 spent a year abroad at Lawrence's London Centre, which had been opened the year before. He spent two more years there over the course of his career: from 1986 to 1987, and 1992 to 1993. By 1976, Chaney was serving as faculty marshal during convocation.

Chaney's primary research topic was Anglo-Saxon England, particularly the conversion from paganism to Christianity, and sacral kingship. Over the course of his career he took 49 trips to Europe, and by 1985, he claimed to have spent twice as much time at Oxford as an undergraduate. This research culminated in his 1970 book The Cult of Kingship in Anglo-Saxon England: The Transition from Paganism to Christianity. Chaney published many other works, including the widely cited 1962 article Grendel and the Gifstol: a Legal View of Monsters. He also gave numerous lectures, including throughout the wider community; The Oshkosh Northwestern termed him a "personable speaker" who was "well known throughout the Fox River Valley", and the Twin City News-Record described him as "[a] popular speaker ... because of his spritel[y] presentation of what could be boring facts of ancient history."

Chaney was a popular presence on campus, and an institution; one of the school's deans stated that 30% of its students considered a "Chaney course" to be a "must", and, by the time of his retirement, 80% of all living alumni had passed through the college during his tenure. A gifted and lively lecturer, Chaney was also readily available to his students, including after graduation. Commenting that upon arriving at Lawrence in 1952 "I thought I would stay two or three years to see what a liberal arts college was like", Chaney said he "fell in love with the place. There was such a sense of community." Starting in the late 1950s and lasting for more than 40 years, Chaney hosted a "salon" at his apartment, just off campus, three or four days a week; students would gather for conversation, classical music, and—depending on age—cream sherry or Dr Pepper. He guided many students to graduate school, whether in history or other subjects, and stayed in touch with them—if largely by letter, as Chaney, who self-deprecatingly referred to himself as a "wave of the past", was by 1996 one of only two Lawrence professors who still lacked a computer in his office. Chaney would also teach courses geared towards adults, including summer seminars—such as on "The Vikings", "Viking Sagas", or "King Arthur's Britain", that were open to anyone aged 18 or older—as well as similar courses during a summer program known as Elderhostel, and several seminars, such as "The Arts as a Mirror of Society" and "King Arthur's Britain", taught during the school year.

In May 1995, former students planted the "Chaney Oak," a tree from England, in sight of Chaney's corner office on the third floor of Main Hall. Two years later, Chaney marked his 45th year at Lawrence, surpassing the record held by Hiram A. Jones, who taught Latin at the university from 1854 until dying in his classroom in 1898; the university declared a "Chaney Day," and rang the Main Hall bell 45 times. 

Chaney officially retired on 13 July 1999, the day Lawrence marked its 150th commencement ceremony, and was awarded an honorary Master of Arts, ad eundem—turning the tables on Chaney, who as faculty marshal was typically the one to bestow such honors. He delivered a lecture entitled "Last Words," on the topic "If you were to give a final message to the students, what would you say?" Chaney continued to teach two courses a year, however, to maintain his Main Hall office, and to take annual research trips to England, Malta, and Greece. "I don't look at it as stopping what I'm doing", Chaney said at the time. "I look at it as continuing but having more time for other aspects. I'll take off my lecturing hat and put on my research/publishing hat." In 2002 he sat for a recorded interview with two students from the class of 1957, with excerpts published in Lawrence's magazine, and the tapes and transcriptions placed in the university's archives.

Honors 
From 1962 to 1999 Chaney held the George McKendree Steele endowed chair in history, and from 1968 to 1971 he was the chair of the history department. He was appointed a Fellow of the Royal Society of Arts in 1977, and was affiliated with the American Historical Association, the Modern Language Association, the American Society of Church History, the Conference on British Studies, the American Association of University Professors, and Phi Beta Kappa. In 1966–1967 was made a grantee in the American Council of Learned Societies, and in 1971 he was named an Outstanding Educator of America. In 1973, he was awarded the Edward and Rosa Uhrig Award for Excellent Teaching, given to a Lawrence faculty member "to give tangible recognition of outstanding performance in the actual teaching process, and for leadership in the quest to insure that students reach their full development as individual human beings and as future leaders of our society". Shortly before his retirement, Chaney was named to "Who's Who Among America's Teachers, 1998". On his 88th birthday, the university established the "William A. Chaney Fund for Excellence in History", with grants to students pursuing significant research.

William A. Chaney Lectureship 

In 2002, Lawrence University began the William A. Chaney Lectureship series, honoring Chaney's retirement by hosting speakers in the humanities to talk on areas, such as medieval history, art history, and musicology and poetry, that Chaney was interested in. The following chart contains a partial list of these lectures.

Personal life 
Chaney once described his political views as "a cross between divine right monarchist and libertarian". Though not politically active, Chaney made an exception during the Vietnam War era to march in the streets, for what he termed "the only time in my life". He loved classical music, and would joke that he did not like anything written after 1791. Chaney incorporated classical music into the salon he hosted; loving the obscure and to teach students to think outside the box, he enjoyed playing works by composers such as Johann Sebastian Bach's lesser-known son, Johann Christian Bach, and what Chaney termed "the three great Ks"—Koželuch, Kuhlau, and Krumpholz—a riff on "the three great Bs".

Chaney never married. He had a cat, named Grendel, which he described as "the most pampered cat in town". When Grendel once ran away when a cat-sitting student left the door open, Chaney, a colleague later recalled, spent "a small fortune" taking out ads in The Post-Crescent; the ads offered an "[i]ncredibly vast reward" for her return. After nearly a year passed and Chaney had given up hope, he returned to his house to find Grendel awaiting him.

Chaney died on March 13, 2013, at his home in Appleton, Wisconsin—215 East Kimball Street, which he had rented for 60 years. Lawrence University held a memorial service for Chaney at its Memorial Chapel on May 18.

Publications 
In addition to his book The Cult of Kingship in Anglo-Saxon England, Chaney wrote numerous journal articles, reviews, and encyclopedia articles, including eleven articles in the New Catholic Encyclopedia alone. Chaney's output measured more than 100 publications by 1985; by his death these included more than 70 articles and 25 reviews.

Books

Articles

Reviews

Other 
  
See also  .

Notes

References

Bibliography

External links 
 Chaney at Lawrence University library archives

1922 births
2013 deaths
People from Lodi, California
Writers from California
Writers from Appleton, Wisconsin
University of the Pacific (United States) alumni
UC Berkeley College of Letters and Science alumni
Harvard Fellows
Lawrence University faculty
Historians from Wisconsin
Historians from California